Port of Termini Imerese is a harbor located in Termini Imerese, Sicily, Italy.
The port, that operates mostly in cargo shipping, is relatively close and integrated with that of Palermo (it's owned by the same Port Authority of Western Sicily).

References

External links
Official site 

Termini Imerese
Transport in Palermo